Großer Stoewer Motorwagen is the convertible concept car manufactured by Stoewer automotive company in 1899. It was designed by Bernhard and Emil Stoewer, and was the first car presented by the company.

History 
The concept car was designed by brothers Bernhard and Emil Stoewer. It was manufactured and presented by the Stoewer in 1899, the same year, the company was founded. It was built in Stettin, Germany (now Szczecin, Poland). It was the first car made by the company, and one of the first in Germany. Its name, Großer Motorwagen means in German Large Motor Car. The model of the car in the original condition is kept in the Polytechnic Museum in Moscow, Russia.

Specifications 
The car was a convertible four-seater. It had a 2.1-litre 2-cylinder engine. Its maximum speed was 17 km/h (11 mph). It had 6.5 brake horsepower.

References 

1890s cars
Cars introduced in 1899
Grosser Motorwagen
Convertibles
Concept cars